The Most Dangerous Game is an American thriller film written and directed by Justin Lee and starring Tom Berenger, Judd Nelson, Bruce Dern, Casper Van Dien and Chris "CT" Tamburello. It is a remake of the 1932 film of the same name, which is based on the 1924 short story by Richard Connell.

Plot 
A father and son are shipwrecked on a remote island where they are caught up in a trophy hunt held by its mysterious owner, a merciless man who uses the land as an elite hunting preserve for stalking the most dangerous game of all: human.

Cast
 Chris "CT" Tamburello as Sanger Rainsford
 Casper Van Dien as Baron Von Wolf
 Judd Nelson as Marcus Rainsford
 Randy Charach as Rex Alan
 Tom Berenger as Benjamin Colt
 Bruce Dern as Whitney Tyler
 Elissa Dowling as Mary
 Eddie Finlay as Quin
 Kevin Porter as Ivan
 Evan Daugherty

Production
The film was shot in the Koenig Pictures backlot in the Pacific Northwest in November 2021.

Release
The film was released in theaters and on digital platforms on August 5, 2022.

See also
Adaptations of The Most Dangerous Game

References

External links
 
 

2022 thriller films
American thriller films
Remakes of American films
Films based on short fiction
2020s English-language films
2020s American films